Hatton is an unincorporated community in Polk County, Arkansas, United States.

Notable person
Osro Cobb, lawyer and politician, was born near Hatton.

Notes

Unincorporated communities in Polk County, Arkansas
Unincorporated communities in Arkansas